Francesco Manganelli (20 October 1940 – 31 August 2022) was an Italian writer and politician who served as a Deputy.

References

1940 births
2022 deaths
20th-century Italian politicians
21st-century Italian politicians
20th-century Italian writers
21st-century Italian writers
Deputies of Legislature XII of Italy
Democratic Party of the Left politicians
People from Nola